The Journey is the second studio album produced by Ky-Mani Marley, Bob Marley's son, Clifton "Specialist" Dillon & Neil Robertson, released on August 22, 2000. The album received good reviews and is Ky-Mani's first album featuring his own songs. The most notable song from this album eventually became "Dear Dad", with lyrics taken from a letter Ky-Mani wrote as a child to his father after he died.

Track listing
 "Rude Boy"
 "Fell In Love"
 "Country Journey"
 "Dear Dad"
 "Return Of A King"
 "Emperor"
 "Party's On"
 "Hi-Way"
 "Tom Drunk"
 "No Faith"
 "Your Love"
 "Fire, Fire"
 "Warriors"
 "Lord Is My Shepherd"

External links 
 Official site of Ky-Mani Marley

Ky-Mani Marley albums
2000 albums